The Roosevelt Public School District is a community public school district that serves students in pre-kindergarten through fifth grade from Roosevelt in Monmouth County, New Jersey, United States.

As of the 2018–19 school year, the district, comprising one school, had an enrollment of 83 students and 9.5 classroom teachers (on an FTE basis), for a student–teacher ratio of 8.7:1. In the 2016–17 school year, Roosevelt had the 6th-smallest enrollment of any school district in the state, with 88 students.

The district is classified by the New Jersey Department of Education as being in District Factor Group "GH", the third-highest of eight groupings. District Factor Groups organize districts statewide to allow comparison by common socioeconomic characteristics of the local districts. From lowest socioeconomic status to highest, the categories are A, B, CD, DE, FG, GH, I and J.

For sixth through twelfth grades, public school students attend the East Windsor Regional School District, which serves students from East Windsor Township and Hightstown Borough, with students from Roosevelt attending as part of a sending/receiving relationship. Schools in the East Windsor district attended by Roosevelt students (with 2018–19 enrollment data from the National Center for Education Statistics) are
Melvin H. Kreps Middle School with 1,230 students in grades 6 - 8 and
Hightstown High School with 1,676 students in grades 9 - 12.

Schools
Roosevelt Public School had an enrollment of 81 students in grades PreK-6 in the 2018–19 school year.
Mary Robinson Cohen, Principal

Administration
Core members of the district's administration are:
Dr. Mary Robinson Cohen, Chief School Administrator
Bernard Biesiada, Business Administrator / Board Secretary

Board of education
The district's board of education, with nine members, sets policy and oversees the fiscal and educational operation of the district through its administration. As a Type II school district, the board's trustees are elected directly by voters to serve three-year terms of office on a staggered basis, with three seats up for election each year held (since 2012) as part of the November general election. The board appoints a superintendent to oversee the day-to-day operation of the district.

References

External links
Roosevelt Public School

School Data for the Roosevelt Public School, National Center for Education Statistics
East Windsor Regional School District

Roosevelt, New Jersey
New Jersey District Factor Group GH
School districts in Monmouth County, New Jersey
Public elementary schools in New Jersey